William Garrett Wright is an American poet, editor, and writer. Raised in Edgefield, South Carolina, Wright has worked as an educator at institutions such as Emory University, Oxford College at Emory University, and The University of Tennessee. His poems have been published in Oxford American, AGNI, Antioch Review, Kenyon Review, and Shenandoah, among others. His first book of poetry, Dark Orchard, was published in 2005. His third book, Tree Heresies, was released in 2015 and won Wright the 2016 Georgia Author of the Year (Poetry) award. Specter Mountain, a collaborative volume of poems written with Jesse Graves, won the Appalachian Book of the Year award in 2019.

Life 
Wright was born and raised in Edgefield, South Carolina. He earned a B.A. in English from the University of South Carolina Aiken, an M.A. in English from Sam Houston State University, and a Ph.D. in English (Creative Writing) from the University of Southern Mississippi.

In the spring of 2016, he served as University of Tennessee Department of English Writer-in-Residence.

Wright is the series editor for The Southern Poetry Anthology.

Selected bibliography

Poetry collections 
 Grass Chapels: New and Selected Poems. Mercer University Press. 
 Tree Heresies. Mercer University Press. 
 Night Field Anecdote. Louisiana Literature Press. 
 Bledsoe. Texas Review Press. 
 Dark Orchard. Texas Review Press.

Chapbooks 
 April Creatures. Blue Horse Press. 
 Xylem & Heartwood. Finishing Line Press. 
 Sleep Paralysis. Stepping Stone Press. 
 The Ghost Narratives. Finishing Line Press.

Collaborative full-length 
 Specter Mountain. Mercer University Press. (Co-written with Jesse Graves), 2018. 
 Creeks of the Upper South. Jacar Press and Unicorn Press (jointly published). (Co-written with Amy Wright), 2016.

As editor 
 Broken Hallelujah: The New and Selected Poems of Jack Butler. Texas Review Press, 2015. 
 Why He Doesn’t Sleep: The Selected Poems of Stephen Gardner. Texas Review Press, 2013.

As co-editor 
 Hard Lines: Rough South Poetry. University of South Carolina Press, 2016. (Co-edited with Daniel Cross Turner). 
 The World Is Charged: Poetic Engagements with Gerard Manley Hopkins. Clemson University Press and Liverpool University Press, 2016 (Co-edited with Daniel Westover).

As series editor and volume co-editor 
 The Southern Poetry Anthology, Volume VIII: Texas. Texas Review Press, 2018. 
 The Southern Poetry Anthology, Volume VII: North Carolina. Texas Review Press, 2014. 
 The Southern Poetry Anthology, Volume VI: Tennessee. Texas Review Press, 2013. (Co-edited with Jesse Graves & Paul Ruffin). 
 The Southern Poetry Anthology, Volume V: Georgia. Texas Review Press, 2012. (Co-edited with Paul Ruffin). 
 The Southern Poetry Anthology, Volume IV: Louisiana. Texas Review Press, 2011. (Co-edited with Paul Ruffin). 
 The Southern Poetry Anthology, Volume III: Contemporary Appalachia. Texas Review Press, 2010. (co-edited with Jesse Graves & Paul Ruffin). 
 The Southern Poetry Anthology, Volume II: Mississippi. Texas Review Press, 2010. (Co-edited with Stephen Gardner). 
 The Southern Poetry Anthology, Volume I: South Carolina. Texas Review Press, 2007. (Co-edited with Stephen Gardner).

References 

Poets from South Carolina
21st-century American poets
Writers from South Carolina
University of Southern Mississippi alumni
Year of birth missing (living people)
Living people
People from Edgefield, South Carolina